Alexander William Wilkinson (born 13 August 1984) is an Australian international football (soccer) player who plays as a central defender and is the captain for Sydney FC in the A-League.

Wilkinson was born in Sydney and made his senior debut for Northern Spirit in 2002. After moving to Ryde City Gunners and Manly United in 2004, Wilkinson joined A-League club Central Coast Mariners, where he eventually became club captain and made over 200 appearances. After spending time in China on loan to Jiangsu Sainty, Wilkinson played for Korean club Jeonbuk Hyundai Motors for 4 seasons (2012–2015).

Wilkinson has made eleven appearances for the Australian national team, including three at the 2014 FIFA World Cup.

Club career
Alexander's bright career began in Ryde East Primary School and Epping Boys' High School where he showed excellent talents on the field as a sportsman and off the field in his sportsmanship. His main junior football club was North Ryde and then with Gladesville Hornsby/Northern Spirit youth team where he played alongside Brett Holman. Two years after breaking into the first team of the Northern Spirit, the NSL would be shut down and went back to finding a job, where he would eventually work at a surf shop in his local Macquarie Centre.

On Sunday 12 November 2006, Noel Spencer was dropped from the starting eleven and in his absence Alex Wilkinson was named captain of the team. Spencer was then struck down with injury and Alex filled in as captain until round 18 when Spencer returned. He was named Captain for Season 3 (2007–2008) and only injury has interrupted that (with ex-Socceroo Tony Vidmar and midfielder John Hutchinson filling in). On 17 March 2011 it was announced that Wilkinson had signed a short-term loan deal with Chinese side Jiangsu Sainty. On 18 July he had signed a two and a half-year contract with K League 1 team Jeonbuk Hyundai Motors. The reported transfer fee paid to the Mariners upon completion of the deal is $450,000. Following a lengthy and successful stint in Asia, Wilkinson signed with Melbourne City in February 2016, for the remainder of the 2015–16 A-League season.

Sydney FC

After Melbourne City were eliminated from the finals series Wilkinson signed a two-year contract with Sydney FC, rejoining former Mariners manager Graham Arnold

In 2017, Wilkinson made sporadic appearances as captain on the pitch with skipper Alex Brosque off and vice-captain Sebastian Ryall injured for the majority of the season.

In July 2019, following the retirement of captain Brosque and after spending 3 years as vice-captain, Wilkinson was appointed captain of Sydney FC.

International career
He represented Australia in 2003 FIFA World Youth Championship. In August 2006, Alex was selected for the first time to join the 22-man Socceroos squad, training for the Asian Cup against Kuwait. He has also joined the 37-man training squad for the Socceroos against Qatar. He made his full national team debut against Ecuador in a friendly at The New Den in London on 5 March 2014.

He was a surprise inclusion for Australia's 2014 World Cup squad and started in Australia's 3–1 opening loss to Chile. After he cleared a certain goal off the line he was the first player in history to be involved in FIFA's new goal line review system which showed he successfully saved a goal.

On 30 March 2015 in a friendly match against FYR Macedonia, at the 72nd minute as captain Mile Jedinak was substituted off the ground, Wilkinson was handed the captain's arm band.

Career statistics

Honours

Club
Central Coast Mariners
 A-League Premiership: 2007–08, 2011–12
 A-League Pre-Season Challenge Cup: 2005

Jeonbuk Hyundai Motors
K League 1: 2014, 2015

Sydney FC
A-League Premiership: 2016–17, 2017–18, 2019–20
A-League Championship: 2016–17, 2018–19, 2019–20
FFA Cup: 2017

International
Australia
 AFC Asian Cup: 2015
 OFC U-20 Championship: 2002
 OFC U-17 Championship: 2001

Individual
 K League Best XI: 2014
 PFA A-League Team of the Season: 2016–17, 2017–18, 2019–20
 Sydney FC Player of the Year: 2020–21 Sydney FC season

References

External links

 Central Coast Mariners profile
 Oz Football profile
 
 

1984 births
Living people
Soccer players from Sydney
People educated at Epping Boys High School
Australia youth international soccer players
Australia under-20 international soccer players
Australian expatriate soccer players
Central Coast Mariners FC players
Northern Spirit FC players
Jiangsu F.C. players
Jeonbuk Hyundai Motors players
Melbourne City FC players
Sydney FC players
A-League Men players
Chinese Super League players
K League 1 players
Expatriate footballers in China
Expatriate footballers in South Korea
Australian expatriate sportspeople in China
Australian expatriate sportspeople in South Korea
2014 FIFA World Cup players
2015 AFC Asian Cup players
AFC Asian Cup-winning players
Association football central defenders
Australian soccer players
Australia international soccer players